The 1940–41 Arkansas Razorbacks men's basketball team represented the University of Arkansas in the 1940–41 college basketball season. The Razorbacks played their home games in the Men's Gymnasium in Fayetteville, Arkansas. It was former Razorback All-American Glen Rose's eighth season as head coach of the Hogs. Arkansas won the Southwest Conference championship for the ninth time overall and first time since the 1937–38 season, finishing with a perfect 12–0 record in conference play and 20–3 overall. It was Arkansas's second perfect conference season (along with 1927–28) and its last until 1976–77. The Razorbacks did not lose a game against collegiate competition during the regular season, but lost two out of three games away from Fayetteville against the Amateur Athletic Union powerhouse Phillips 66ers. Arkansas was invited to the NCAA tournament for the first time (narrowly missing out on the inaugural tournament in 1939, with rival Texas winning the SWC by one game and gaining the league's bid to the tournament) and won its first ever NCAA Tournament game against Wyoming, 52–40. The Razorbacks advanced to their first ever Final Four, where they fell to eventual national runner-up, Washington State.

Multiple Razorbacks had outstanding seasons, with Johnny Adams, Howard Hickey, and John Freiberger all garnering First Team All-SWC honors. Adams, a pioneer of the jump shot, was also recognized as a First Team All-American by Helms. Adams set the SWC scoring record during the February 21 game against  with 36 points. Gordon Carpenter and R.C. Pitts would go on to be Olympic gold medalists in basketball during the 1948 Summer Olympics.

Roster

Schedule and Results
Schedule retrieved from HogStats.com.

|-
!colspan=12 style=|Regular season

|-
!colspan=12 style=|  NCAA Tournament

References

Arkansas Razorbacks
Arkansas Razorbacks men's basketball seasons
Arkansas
NCAA Division I men's basketball tournament Final Four seasons